Ramakrishna Sarada Mission Vivekananda Vidyabhavan (RKSMVV) is a partly residential degree college for women affiliated with the West Bengal State University, India.

History
Even before Swami Vivekananda started the Belur Math, he wanted to establish a Math for women with the Holy Mother Sri Sarada Devi as its centre. However, it was during the Holy Mother's birth centenary in 1954, that Sri Sarada Math came into existence.

In 1960, the Trustees of Sri Sarada Math founded the Ramakrishna Sarada Mission Association with the object of propagating educational, cultural, charitable, medical and similar activities among women and children. Through the headquarters at Dakshineswar, Calcutta, and its branch centres around India, the Ramakrishna Sarada Mission seeks to serve women and children in all possible ways, irrespective of caste, creed, colour and nationality. At present, the Math and the Mission run about 25 centres in India and abroad.

Vivekananda Vidyabhavan, a partly residential degree college for women, was the first educational institution started by the Ramakrishna Sarada Mission. It came into existence in 1961 as a humble effort to carry out Swami Vivekananda's ideals of education among women. The inaugural meeting to set up the college took place at 33 Nayapatty Road, Kolkata-55, on 10 March 1961. The meeting was presided by most revered Swami Mahadevananda, the then-General Secretary of the Ramakrishna Math and Mission.

Housed initially in a one-roomed makeshift structure, with 31 students and a handful of young, idealistic and enthusiastic teachers and monastic members, the college today stands among the premier women's institutions of the state.

Academics
The following subjects are offered for three years’ degree course B.A. recognised by West Bengal State University.

B.A.
 Bengali (Honours and General)
 English (Honours and General)
 Sanskrit (Honours and General)
 Education (Honours and General)
 History (Honours and General)
 Philosophy (Honours and General)
 Political Science (Honours and General)
 Economics (Honours and General) (B.A. /B.Sc.)
 Sociology (Honours and General)
 Human Rights (General)
 Journalism (General)
 Mathematics (General) (B.Sc.)

Student life
Ramakrishna Sarada Mission Vivekananda Vidyabhavan is a partly residential college, and the hostel forms an integral part in imparting an all-around education. Run on the system of the ancient "Gurukul," it pays special attention to the cultivation of aspects of the student's personality, which are otherwise neglected in a conventional educational system.

Boarders are housed in two spacious buildings — Bharati Bhavan and Brahmananda Bhavan. The resident superintendent, a monastic member of the Order, is in charge of the hostel, under the supervision and guidance of the principal.

Library
Ramakrishna Sarada Mission Vivekananda Vidyabhavan Library now known as "Sraddhaprana Pathakakshma" was set up in 1961, when the college was established. Earlier the library was housed at the college building adjacent to the Teachers' Common Room. In 1975, it was shifted to the first floor of the Assembly hall (Muktiprana Sabhagriha). After recent expansion and modernisation of the library, the reading room has become more spacious and user-friendly. Teachers' cubicles have been added.

The online public access catalogue (OPAC) is accessible at: here.

References

External links

Educational institutions established in 1961
Universities and colleges affiliated with the Ramakrishna Mission
Colleges affiliated to West Bengal State University
Women's universities and colleges in West Bengal
1961 establishments in West Bengal